Clear Stream is an  river in northern New Hampshire in the United States. It is a tributary of the Androscoggin River, which flows south and east into Maine, joining the Kennebec River near the Atlantic Ocean.

Clear Stream flows out of Dixville Notch, a dramatic gap through the mountains of northern New Hampshire. The stream is formed by the juncture of Cascade Brook and Flume Brook. The stream flows southeast through the townships of Dixville and Millsfield before joining the Androscoggin River in the town of Errol. New Hampshire Route 26 follows the stream for its entire length.

See also

List of rivers of New Hampshire

References

Rivers of New Hampshire
Rivers of Coös County, New Hampshire